Gregory Briley (born May 24, 1965), nicknamed "Pee Wee", is a former Major League Baseball outfielder who played for the Seattle Mariners and Florida Marlins from 1988 to 1993.

Briley attended North Carolina State University, where he played college baseball for the Wolfpack in 1986. In 1985, he played collegiate summer baseball with the Hyannis Mets of the Cape Cod Baseball League and was named a league all-star.

In 2009, he was named the hitting coach for the Kannapolis Intimidators, and later held the same coaching position for the Great Falls Voyagers in the Chicago White Sox organization.

References

External links

Retrosheet
Mexican League
Venezuelan Professional Baseball League
Great Falls Voyagers Roster

1965 births
Living people
African-American baseball players
American expatriate baseball players in Canada
American expatriate baseball players in Mexico
Baseball players from North Carolina
Bellingham Mariners players
Calgary Cannons players
Charlotte Knights players
Chattanooga Lookouts players
Duluth-Superior Dukes players
Florida Marlins players
Hyannis Harbor Hawks players
Indianapolis Indians players
Jacksonville Suns players
Leones del Caracas players
American expatriate baseball players in Venezuela
Louisburg Hurricanes baseball players
Major League Baseball outfielders
NC State Wolfpack baseball players
Olmecas de Tabasco players
Petroleros de Poza Rica players
Seattle Mariners players
Toledo Mud Hens players